The women's hammer throw event at the 2002 Commonwealth Games was held on 26 July.

Medalists

Results

Qualification
Qualification: 63.00 m (Q) or at least 12 best (q) qualified for the final.

Final

References
Official results
Results at BBC

Hammer
2002
2002 in women's athletics